Adrenaline MMA was a mixed martial arts organization that operated primarily in North America.  It was formerly part of M-1 Global but became independent in October 2007 with Monte Cox as its head.

History

Foundation
In October 2007, Sibling Entertainment Group, a producer of theater and other entertainment, announced that its newly created subsidiary, Sibling Sports LLC, was purchasing M-1 Mixfight, a Russian-based mixed martial arts promotion owned by Vadim Finkelstein. The new venture was named M-1 Global. Along with the purchase, Fedor Emelianenko, the last PRIDE Heavyweight Champion and a free agent managed by Finkelstein, was to sign with the new organization. Monte Cox, an established promoter and manager who has managed fighters like UFC champions Tim Sylvia, Matt Hughes and Rich Franklin and promoted around 500 cards, was appointed its first president. Finkelstein, however, continued his M-1 operations in Russia, running the M-1 Mixfight website independently of Sibling and Cox and promoting his own events under the M-1 banner.

Although the organization had yet to hold its first card, its first co-promotion effort was Yarennoka! held in Saitama, Japan on New Year's Eve, 2007. Yarennoka! was held by former executives of PRIDE Fighting Championships, with M-1 Global billed as a co-promoter. Fedor Emelianenko appeared on the card, defeating Hong-Man Choi via armbar in the first round.

On April 19, 2008, Monte Cox confirmed that Finkelstein had split from M-1 Global. Cox also revealed that Emelianenko never actually did consummate an agreement with M-1 Global, and that Emelianenko would become a free agent again. Finkelstein would resume his operations with M-1 Mixfight, while the Sibling subsidiary headed by Cox would be known as Adrenaline, not to be confused with "ADRYNYLYN" which is an up-and-coming MMA promotional platform based out of Chicago Illinois.

The official first event took place on June 14, 2008, and was headlined by Mike Russow and Jason Guida.

Adrenaline's website is gone and has not been replaced.

Events

References

External links
Adrenaline MMA Official Site
M-1 Global Official Site
Sibling Sports Official Site

Organizations established in 2009
Mixed martial arts organizations